Stigmina is a genus of fungal plant pathogens.

Selected species 
 Stigmina carpophila
 Stigmina palmivora
 Stigmina platani
 Stigmina platani-racemosae
 Stigmina liquidambaris

References

Fungal plant pathogens and diseases
Dothideales
Dothideomycetes genera